Lissodus is an extinct genus of freshwater shark. It lived from the Early Carboniferous subperiod to the Albian age of the Cretaceous.

Known species:

Lissodus africanus 

Lissodus angulatus 

Lissodus bartheli

Lissodus cassangensis

Lissodus cristatus 

Lissodus guenneguesi 

Lissodus hasleensis 

Lissodus johnsonorum 

Lissodus leiodus 

Lissodus leiopleurus 

Lissodus lepagei 

Lissodus levis 

Lissodus minimus 

Lissodus wardi 

Lissodus xiushuiensis

References 

Prehistoric shark genera
Mesozoic fish of Asia
Jurassic sharks
Mesozoic fish of Europe
Hasle Formation